The 1986 Volvo U.S. Indoor Championships was a men's tennis tournament played on indoor carpet courts at the Racquet Club of Memphis in Memphis, Tennessee in the United States that was part of the 1986 Nabisco Grand Prix. It was the 16th edition of the tournament was held from February 3 through February 10, 1986. Eighth-seeded Brad Gilbert won the singles title and earned $45,000 first-prize money.

Finals

Singles
 Brad Gilbert defeated  Stefan Edberg 7–5, 7–6(7–3)
 It was Gilbert's 1st singles title of the year and the 7th of his career.

Doubles
 Ken Flach /  Robert Seguso defeated  Guy Forget /  Anders Järryd 6–4, 4–6, 7–6(7–5)

References

External links
 ITF tournament edition details

Volvo U.S. National Indoor
U.S. National Indoor Championships
Tennis in Tennessee
Volvo U.S. National Indoor
Volvo U.S. National Indoor
Volvo U.S. National Indoor